The 2017 Central American Games, the XI edition of the Central American Games, were hosted in Managua, Nicaragua during 3–17 December 2017.

Sports

 Athletics  (Details)
 Basketball  (Details)
 Handball  (Details)
 Baseball  (Details)
 Boxing  (Details)
 Biking  (Details)
 Swimming  (Details)
 Fencing  (Details)
 Football  (Details)
 Golf  (Details)
 Weightlifting  (Details)
 Field hockey  (Details)
 Karate (Details)
 Judo  (Details)
 Wrestling  (Details)
 Rowing  (Details)
 Rugby sevens  (Details)
 Taekwondo  (Details)
 Tennis  (Details)
 Table tennis  (Details)
 Softball (Details)
 Surfing (Details)
 Triathlon  (Details)
 Volleyball  (Details)

In addition, four sports that are not part of the Olympic schedule will be included:   
   

 Chess  (Details)
 Billiards  (Details)
 Bodybuilding  (Details)
 Sambo (Details)

Medal table

References
Medallero Oficial de los Juegos Centroamericanos Managua 2017 http://www.managua2017.org/medallero 

 
Central American Games
International sports competitions hosted by Nicaragua
Central American Games
2017 in Central American sport
2017 in Nicaraguan sport
Multi-sport events in Nicaragua